Tina Nedergaard (born March 28, 1969) was the Education Minister of Denmark from 2010 to 2011. She was a member of the Folketing from 2001 to 2015 sitting for two terms.

Early life and education
Tina Nedergaard was born on March 28, 1969 in Aarhus, Denmark to a family of farmers.
In 1988, Nedergaard enrolled at a high school in Hobro, Denmark specializing in math and social sciences. Afterwards, she graduated with a Master of Science in political sciences from the Aarhus University in 1997.

Career
After graduating in 1997, Nedergaard started her career as a program director for the European branch of the International Education Centre. A year later, she moved to work for the Confederation of Danish Employers as a consultant until 2002.

Throughout Nedergaard's political career, she was a spokesperson for various topics including information technology, education and food. At the 2001 Danish general elections, Nedergard was elected to the Folketing for the North Jutland County riding. After her term expired in 2007, she was reelected to the Folketing during the 2007 Danish general elections.

During her second term at the Folketinget, Nedergaard was selected to become the Education Minister of Denmark on February 23, 2010 after a cabinet reshuffle. During her position as education minister, Nedergaard proposed for Danish high schools to teach Chinese as another language. On March 8, 2011, Nedergaard left her position as education minister after the resignation of Birthe Roenn Hornbech due to personal matters. Her second term at the Folketing ended in 2015.

References

1969 births
Living people
Education ministers of Denmark
Women government ministers of Denmark
Members of the Folketing 2001–2005
Members of the Folketing 2005–2007
Members of the Folketing 2007–2011
Members of the Folketing 2011–2015
Women members of the Folketing